Okan Öztürk (born 30 November 1977) is a former Turkish professional footballer. He played as a striker.

Club career
Öztürk began his professional career with Merzifonspor in 1995, before signing for P.T.T. before the 1996-97 season. He has played seven seasons in the Turkish Süper Lig with Siirtspor, Çaykur Rizespor and Gençlerbirliği S.K., appearing in over 200 league matches and scoring more than 50 goals.

References

1977 births
Living people
People from Merzifon
Turkish footballers
Türk Telekom G.S.K. footballers
Altay S.K. footballers
Batman Petrolspor footballers
Siirtspor footballers
Çaykur Rizespor footballers
Gençlerbirliği S.K. footballers
Karşıyaka S.K. footballers
Bozüyükspor footballers
Yeni Malatyaspor footballers
Association football forwards
Süper Lig players